In construction, cross bracing is a system utilized to reinforce building structures in which diagonal supports intersect. Cross bracing is usually seen with two diagonal supports placed in an X-shaped manner. Under lateral force (such as wind or seismic activity) one brace will be under tension while the other is being compressed. In steel construction, steel cables may be used due to their great resistance to tension (although they cannot take any load in compression). The common uses for cross bracing include bridge (side) supports, along with structural foundations. This method of construction maximizes the weight of the load a structure is able to support. It is a usual application when constructing earthquake-safe buildings.

Cross bracing can be applied to any rectangular frame structure, such as chairs and bookshelves. Its rigidity for two-dimensional grid structures can be analyzed mathematically as an instance of the grid bracing problem.

Cross bracing may employ full diagonals, or corner bracing or knee bracing.

Mining tunnels

To add rigidity to the construction of mining tunnels, the cross-beam connecting between arches is also a type of cross brace. They are often tubular and modified on the ends with clips or apertures for screw fastening. They serve as a stiffening element for the stability of a design. This brace could also be an ordinary cross-section wooden cross-beam, or even a board.

Cross bracing can be seen in situations like flooring, where cross braces are put between floor joists in order to prevent movement. It is also commonly used for ship making in order to stand against heavy winds or extreme weather.

References

Building engineering
Underground mining